Yoder is an unincorporated community and a U.S. Post Office located in El Paso County, Colorado, United States. The Yoder Post Office has the ZIP Code 80864.

A post office called Yoder has been in operation since 1904. Ira M. Yoder, an early postmaster, gave the community his name.

Students are served by the Edison Junior-Senior High School of the Edison School District 54JT, as well as by the Miami-Yoder School District 60JT.

References

Unincorporated communities in El Paso County, Colorado
Unincorporated communities in Colorado